Commissioner v. Wodehouse, 337 U.S. 369 (1949), was a United States Supreme Court case in which the Court held that lump sums paid in advance by publications to non-resident aliens are taxable income under the Revenue Act and are indistinguishable from "royalties" paid over time within the meaning of that Act.

References

External links
 

1949 in United States case law
United States Supreme Court cases
United States Supreme Court cases of the Vinson Court
United States copyright case law